This is a list of the works by Purushottam Laxman Deshpande (1947–1999)

Books

Humour
 Golabereej (गोळाबेरीज) - 1960
 AghaL-PaghaL (अघळ-पघळ) - 1998
 Marathi Vangmayacha (Galeev) Itihas (मराठी वाङ्‌मयाचा (गाळीव) इतिहास) – 1970
 Khogirbharati (खोगीरभरती) - 1950
 Hasavnuk (हसवणूक) - 1968
 Batatyachi Chaal (बटाट्याची चाळ)
 Khilli (खिल्ली) - 1984
 Asa mi Asami (असा मी असामी) - 1964
 UralaSurala (उरलंसुरलं) - 1999
 Purchundi (पुरचुंडी) – 1999

Travelogues
 Vangachitre (वंगचित्रे) – 1974
 Apoorvai (अपूर्वाई) – 1960
 Poorvarang (पूर्वरंग) -1963
 Jaave Tyanchya Desha (जावे त्यांच्या देशा) – 1974

Adaptations
 Kay Wattel Te Hoeel (काय वाट्टेल ते होईल) –  1962...translation of Helen and George Papashvily's Anything Can Happen
 Eka Koliyane (एका कोळीयाने) – 1965...translation of Ernest Hemingway's The Old Man and the Sea
 Kanhoji Angre (कान्होजी आंग्रे)(Translation of English novel "Maratha Admiral Kanhoji Angre" by Manohar Malgoankar)
 Poravay (पोरवय)  –1995... translation of "Chhelebela" By Ravindranath Tagore

Biographies (व्यक्तिचित्रं)
 Gangot (गणगोत) – 1966
 Gandhiji (गांधीजी) – 1970
 Guna Gaeen Awadi (गुण गाईन आवडी) – 1975
 Maitra (मैत्र)   – 1989
 Apulki (आपुलकी)  – 1998

Collection of Speeches
 Rasikaho! (रसिकहो!) - 1995
 Soojanaho! (सुजनहो!) -2002
 Mitra Ho! (मित्र हो!) - 1995
 Shrote Ho! (श्रोते हो!) -1996
 Speeches on radio and radio-plays - Parts 1 and 2 (रेडियोवरील भाषणे व श्रुतिका - भाग एक व दोन) - 2001

Humorous Essays
 Gacchi saha Zalich Pahije (गच्ची सह झालीच पाहिजे)
 Eka Raviwarchi Sakaal (एका रविवारची सकाळ)
 Maze Shahari Jeevan (माझे शहरी जीवन)
 Bigari Te Matric (बिगरी ते मॅट्रिक) - Hasavnuk (हसवणूक)
 Mumbaikar, Punekar Ka Nagpurkar? (मुंबईकर, पुणेकर का नागपूरकर?)
 Mhais (म्हैस) - Golabereej (गोळाबेरीज) 
 Mi Ani Majha Shatrupaksha (मी आणि माझा शत्रुपक्ष) - Hasavnuk (हसवणूक)
 Paliv Pranee (पाळीव प्राणी) - Hasavnuk (हसवणूक)
 Kahi Nave Grahayog (काही नवे ग्रहयोग)
 Majhe Poshtik Jeewan (माझे पोष्टिक जीवन) - Hasavnuk (हसवणूक)

Other
 Vyakti Ani Valli (व्यक्ती आणि वल्ली) – 1962
 Ek Shunya Mee (एक शून्य मी) - 2001
 Chitramay Swagat (चित्रमय स्वगत) - 1996
 Pu. La. : Ek Sathawan (पु. ल : एक साठवण)  – 1979
 Daad (दाद) - 1997
 Dwidal (द्विदल) - 2004
 Char Shabd (चार शब्द) - 1996
 Mukkam Shantiniketan (मुक्काम शांतिनिकेतन) - 2001
 Ravindranath : Teen Vyakhyane (रवीन्द्रनाथ : तीन व्याख्याने) - 1981
 Telephone-cha Janma (टेलिफोनचा जन्म)
 Kolhapur Darshan (Shriman Madan Mohan Lohiya Shashtyabdipurti nimitta abhinandan grantha) - 1971 .. Co-authored with Madanmohan Basantilal Lohia and Ganesh Rango Bhide.

Drama
 Tuka Mhane Ata (तुका म्हणे आता) – 1948
 Pudhari Pahije (पुढारी पाहिजॆ) – 1951
 Ammaldar (अंमलदार) – 1952...based on Nikolai Gogol's Inspector General
 Bhagyawan (भाग्यवान) – 1953
 Tujhe Ahe Tujhapashi (तुझें आहे तुजपाशीं) – 1957
 Sundar Mi Honar (सुंदर मी होणार) – 1958
 Pahila Raja/adhe Adhure (पहिला राजा/आधे अधूरे) – 1976...based on Jagadish Chandra Mathur's  Adhe Adhure
 Teen Paishancha Tamasha (तीन पैशांचा तमाशा) – 1978...based on Bertolt Brecht's The Three Penny Opera'

  Ti Fulrani (ती फुलराणी) – 1975...based on George Bernard Shaw's Pygmalion Varyavarchi Varaat (वाऱ्यावरची वरात)
 Eka Jhunja Varyashi (एक झुंज वाऱ्याशीं) -1988... based on "The Last Appointment" By Vladin Dozortsev
 Vatvat Vatvat (वटवट वटवट)  -1971

One-act plays
 Mothe Mase Aani Chhote Mase (मोठे मासे आणि छोटे मासे) – 1957
 Vitthal To Aala Aala (विठ्ठल तो आला आला) – 1961
 Aamhi Latike Na Bolu (आम्ही लटिके ना बोलू) – 1975
 Nasti Uthathev (नस्ती उठाठेव) - 1952

One-man stage shows
 Batatyachi Chaal (बटाट्याची चाळ) - 1958
 Asa Mi Asami (असा मी असामी)
 Hasawinyacha Majha Dhanda (हसविण्याचा माझा धंदा)
 Varyawarachi Varaat (वा-यावरची वरात) – A large part of this play is one man show.

Children's plays
 Vay Motha Khota (वयं मोठं खोटं) – 1956
 Nave Gokul'' (नवे गोकुळ) – 1958

References

Bibliographies by writer
Bibliographies of Indian writers
Dramatist and playwright bibliographies